Karlen Asieshvili (born 21 April 1987) is a Georgian rugby union player. His position is prop, and he currently plays for Brive in the Top 14 and the Georgia national team. He played for Georgia in the 2015 Rugby World Cup.

References

1987 births
Living people
Rugby union players from Georgia (country)
Rugby union players from Tbilisi
Rugby union props
Georgia international rugby union players